The , or , is a  member of the Japanese cabinet and is the leader of the Japanese Ministry of Defense, the executive department of the Japanese Armed Forces. The minister of defense’s position of command and authority over the military is second only to that of the Prime Minister of Japan, who is the commander-in-chief. 

The minister of defense is appointed by the Prime Minister and is a member of the National Security Council. The current Minister of Defense is Yasukazu Hamada, who took office on August 10, 2022.

History
On 26 December 2007, the Government of Japan made the decision to reform its Defense Agency to the Ministry of Defense in the expectation to have a far-reaching effect on Japan's future military development. The defense policy that has been pursued by Japan is based on the "Basic Policy for National Defense", which was adopted by the Cabinet in May 1957. Japan's main goal of national defense is the prevention of indirect as well as direct aggression from outside enemies.

The Japanese government reformed the Defense Agency to the Ministry of Defense with a ceremony that was attended by then Prime Minister Shinzō Abe and the then-new Minister of Defense Fumio Kyuma. The creation of the Ministry of Defense was in conjunction with Prime Minister Shinzō Abe's continued efforts to ensure a stronger image of the Japan Self-Defense Forces (JSDF). The bill in which to upgrade the Defense Agency to the Ministry of Defense was approved by the House of Representatives (lower house) in November 2007, and the House of Councillors (upper house) in mid-December 2007. Minister Kyuma personally attended a session in the House of Councillors and gave a speech after the bill was approved.

In light of the Defense Agency being transformed into the Ministry of Defense, the JSDF was given the responsibilities of international operations, disaster relief and peacekeeping within the overseas locations.

On 11 September 2019, Taro Kono became the first high profile 'prime minister-ready' politician to head the Ministry of Defense. He has the strongest LDP factional backing of any defense minister thus far. His social media following is second only to Prime Minister Shinzo Abe. He's a leading candidate for post-Abe premiership. Kono previously held the prominent role of foreign minister.

Chain of command
1. Prime Minister
2. Minister of Defense
3. Chief of Staff, Joint Staff

Structure
The Commander-in-Chief of the Japan Self-Defense Forces (JSDF), who does not formally constitute a uniformed military, is the Prime Minister. The Emperor of Japan is a constitutional monarch who does not have political or military authority over the JSDF; that authority rests with the Prime Minister. However, it is important to note that the Emperor formally appoints the Prime Minister to office. The Minister of Defense is responsible for the organization and formulating the national security policy. The budget request is drafted by the Ministry of Finance and making its own legislative proposals to the National Diet.

The Minister of Defense is advised on every concern related to the duties of the Japan Self-Defense Forces by the Chief of Staff, Joint Staff.

List of Ministers of Defense (2007–)

Allied occupation of Japan

Following the end of World War II, the Armed Forces of the Empire of Japan were disbanded and US forces took control. From 1950 to 1952, the National Police Reserve led by Minister of State Takeo Ōhashi was formed. It was renamed as the National Safety Force in 1952. In 1952, the Coastal Safety Force, the waterborne counterpart of the National Police Reserve, was founded and led by the  Tokutarō Kimura.

Director general of the Defense Agency
These are the director generals of the Defense Agency. It is the predecessor of the Ministry of Defense which was established on 9 January 2007.

 Tokutarō Kimura 1954
 Seiichi Ōmura 1954-1955
 Arata Sugihara 1955
 Shigemasa Sunada 1955
 Funada Naka 1955-1956
 Tanzan Ishibashi 1956-1957
 Nobusuke Kishi 1957
 Akira Kodaki 1957
 Juichi Tsushima 1957-1958
 Gisen Satō 1958-1959
 Shigejirō Inō 1959
 Munenori Akagi 1959-1960
 Masumi Esaki 1960
 Naomi Nishimura 1960
 Sensuke Fujieda 1961-1962
 Kenjirō Shiga 1962-1963
 Fukuda Tokuyasu 1963-1964
 Jun'ya Koizumi 1964-1965
 Raizo Matsuno 1965-1966
 Eikichi Kanbayashiyama 1966
 Kaneshichi Masuda 1966-1968
 Kiichi Arita 1968-1970
 Yasuhiro Nakasone 1970-1971
 Keiichi Masuhara 1971
 Naomi Nishimura 1971
 Ezaki Masumi 1971-1972
 Keiichi Masuhara 1972-1973
 Yamanaka Yasunori 1973-1974
 Sōsuke Uno 1974
 Michita Sakata 1974-1976
 Asao Mihara 1976-1977
 Shin Kanemaru 1977-1978
 Ganri Yamashita 1978-1979
 Enji Kubota 1979-1980
 Yoshizo Hosoda 1980
 Koji Omura 1980-1981
 Soichiro Ito 1981-1982
 Kazuho Tanigawa 1982-1983
 Kurihara Yoshiyuki 1983-1984
 Koichi Kato 1984-1986
 Kurihara Yoshiyuki 1986-1987
 Riki Kawara 1987-1988
 Kichirō Tazawa 1988-1989
 Taku Yamasaki 1989
 Jūrō Matsumoto 1989-1990
 Yozo Ishikawa 1990
 Yukihiko Ikeda 1990-1991
 Sohei Miyashita 1991-1992
 Toshio Nakayama 1992-1993
 Nakanishi Keisuke 1993
 Kazuo Aichi 1993-1994
 Atsushi Kanda 1994
 Tokuichiro Tamazawa 1994-1995
 Seishirō Etō 1995-1996
 Hideo Usui 1996
 Fumio Kyūma 1996-1998
 Fukushiro Nukaga 1998
 Hosei Norota 1998-1999
 Riki Kawara 1999-2000
 Kazuo Torashima 2000
 Toshitsugu Saito 2000-2001
 Gen Nakatani 2001-2002
 Shigeru Ishiba 2002-2004
 Yoshinori Ohno 2004-2005
 Fukushiro Nukaga 2005-2006
 Fumio Kyūma 2006-2007

Ministers with military experience

Although Article 68 of the Constitution states that all members of the Cabinet must be civilians, former military persons may be appointed Minister of Defense.

 Raizo Matsuno - served in the Imperial Japanese Navy during World War II and rose to rank of Lieutenant commander
 Yasuhiro Nakasone - served in the Imperial Japanese Navy during World War II and rose to rank of Lieutenant commander  and worked as Paymaster
 Sōsuke Uno - served in the Imperial Japanese Army during World War II and rose to rank of Second Lieutenant
 Soichiro Ito  - served in the Imperial Japanese Army during World War II and rose to rank of Second Lieutenant
 Shin Kanemaru - served briefly in the Kwantung Army as Sergeant in 1937-1938 and was discharged due to illness
 Satoshi Morimoto - served in Japan Air Self-Defense Force and rose to rank as Major
 Gen Nakatani - served in Japan Ground Self-Defense Force as platoon leader and instructor with rank of Lieutenant

See also

Previous positions that covered the role of the Minister of Defense:

 Ministers of the Army of Japan - created in 1885 (Ministry existed since 1872) to administer the Imperial Japanese Army and abolished in 1945 
 Ministers of the Navy of Japan - created in 1885 (Ministry existed since 1872) to administer the Imperial Japanese Navy and abolished in 1945
 There was no Ministry or Minister of Air Force rather the navy and army had their own separate bureaux:
 Imperial Japanese Naval Aviation Bureau was led by a Commander
 Vice Admiral Eikichi Katagiri served in 1941-1945
 Imperial Japanese Army Air Service
 Minister of War - created in 683 as Hyōseikan to administer military affairs, renamed as Hyōbu-shō in 702 and lasted to 1872; Ministers were either son or relative of the Emperor

References

 "Library of Congress Country Studies", JAPAN, The Defense Agency. . Retrieved 18 July 2010.

2007 establishments in Japan
Ministries established in 2007

Politics of Japan

fr:Ministère japonais de la Défense